Flammeovirga pectinis is a Gram-negative, aerobic, rod-shaped and motile bacterium from the genus of Flammeovirga which has been isolated from the gut of the scallop Patinopecten yessoensis.

References

Cytophagia
Bacteria described in 2020